Luciano Spinosi (born 9 May 1950) is an Italian former football coach and a former player who played as a defender.

Club career
The clubs for which Spinosi played include A.S. Roma and Juventus F.C. He also played for Hellas Verona F.C., A.C. Milan and A.C. Cesena.

International career
For the Italy national football team Spinosi totalled 22 caps: 19 at senior level, between 1971 and 1974, and 3 at youth level, between 1969 and 1971. His Italy under-21 debut came on 19 November 1969 in a 2–0 loss to the Netherlands. He made his senior international debut on 9 June 1971, in a 0–0 draw against Sweden; his only international goal came on 17 June 1972, in a 3–3 draw against Romania. Spinosi was also a member of the Italian national team that later took part at the 1974 FIFA World Cup, under manager Ferruccio Valcareggi.

Style of play
A tenacious, hard-tackling, and reliable defender, Spinosi usually played as a right-back early on in his career, but was later deployed as a man-marking centre-back, or "stopper". He was known for his temperament, concentration, tight marking of opponents, and professionalism, and was capable of playing both in a zonal marking and man-marking system. He also possessed solid technique, which enabled him to contribute to his teams attacking plays with runs up the flank, and he was even deployed as a wide midfielder on occasion during his time with Roma. Due to his height, he excelled in the air, and was known for his ability to utilise his aerial prowess by making attacking runs into the penalty area.

Personal life
His older brother Enrico Spinosi also played football professionally. To distinguish them, Enrico was referred to as Spinosi I and Luciano as Spinosi II.

Honours 
 AS Roma
 Coppa Italia: 1968-69, 1979-80, 1980-81
 Juventus FC
 Serie A: 1971–72, 1972–73, 1974–75, 1976–77, 1977–78
 UEFA Cup: 1976–77

References

1950 births
Living people
Footballers from Rome
Italian footballers
A.S. Roma players
Juventus F.C. players
Hellas Verona F.C. players
A.C. Milan players
A.C. Cesena players
Serie A players
Serie B players
Italy international footballers
1974 FIFA World Cup players
Italian football managers
A.S. Roma managers
Serie A managers
U.S. Lecce managers
Ternana Calcio managers
UEFA Cup winning players
Association football defenders